Confess is the second album by Dominican-American artist Twin Shadow, released on July 10, 2012, through 4AD.

Background and recording
Although its predecessor, Forget, reminisces over the past, Confess focuses on the present. George Lewis Jr. explained, "This album is about being on the road and the way my relationships have changed with people. I'm spelling out my reality as it is right now."

Commercial performance and reception

Critical reception for Confess was positive. At Metacritic, which assigns a normalized rating out of 100 to reviews from mainstream critics, the album has received an average score of 76, based on 32 reviews.

Confess debuted with first week sales of 8,000 copies in the United States. As of March 2015, Confess has sold 30,000 copies in the United States.

Track listing

Personnel
 George Lewis Jr. – vocals, production
 Wynne Bennett – backing vocals

Other personnel
 Michael H. Brauer – mixing
 Ryan Gilligan – mix assistant, Pro Tools engineer
 Leon Kelly – assistant recording engineer

Charts

References

2012 albums
Twin Shadow albums